Eric Wade Cammack (born August 14, 1975) is a former relief pitcher in Major League Baseball who played briefly for the New York Mets during the  season. A native of Nederland, Texas, he was selected by the Mets in the 1997 draft out of the Lamar University Cardinals.

In eight relief appearances, Cammack posted a 6.30 earned run average and did not have a decision or saves, giving up seven runs on seven hits and 10 walks while striking out nine in 10.0 innings of work.

Cammack also pitched from 1997 through 2004 in the Mets, Astros and Athletics minor league systems. In 134 games, he collected a 24–15 record with a 3.17 ERA and 68 saves in  innings.

As a hitter, Cammack hit a triple in his first and only at bat, joining Charlie Lindstrom (1958), Eduardo Rodríguez (1973), and Scott Munninghoff (1980) as the only players to accomplish this feat in major league history.

See also
2000 New York Mets season

External links

Eric Cammack at Ultimate Mets Database
Eric Cammack at Pura Pelota (Venezuelan Professional Baseball League)

1975 births
Living people
Baseball players from Texas
Binghamton Mets players
Capital City Bombers players
Lamar Cardinals baseball players
Major League Baseball pitchers
Navegantes del Magallanes players
American expatriate baseball players in Venezuela
New Orleans Zephyrs players
Norfolk Tides players
New York Mets players
People from Nederland, Texas
Pittsfield Mets players
Round Rock Express players
Sacramento River Cats players
St. Lucie Mets players